Stella Jantuan (born 13 September 1966) is a Moldovan politician.

Jantuan served as Chief of Unit of the Information and Analysis Department, Parliament of the Republic of Moldova.

She has been a member of the Parliament of Moldova from 2009 to 2014.

External links 
 assembly.coe.int
 Site-ul Parlamentului Republicii Moldova
 Partidul Democrat din Moldova

1966 births
Living people
Moldovan MPs 2009–2010
Democratic Party of Moldova MPs
Moldovan female MPs
21st-century Moldovan women politicians